This is a list of seasons completed by the Louisiana–Monroe Warhawks football team of the National Collegiate Athletic Association (NCAA) Division I Football Bowl Subdivision (FBS). Louisiana–Monroe's first football team was fielded in 1931.

Originally a NJCAA team, what would eventually become Northeast Louisiana University would first begin competing as a 4-year institution in 1951. ULM spent years as a I-AA team in the Southland Conference, including a national championship season in 1987. ULM moved up to Division I-A in 1994, and competed as a football independent for seven season, before joining the Sun Belt Conference in 2001, of which it has been a member since.

Seasons

Statistics correct as of the end of the 2018 college football season

References

Louisiana-Monroe

Louisiana-Monroe Warhawks football seasons